The Royal Society and Académie des sciences Microsoft Award was an annual award given by the Royal Society and the Académie des sciences to scientists working in Europe who had made a major contribution to the advancement of science through the use of computational methods. It was sponsored by Microsoft Research.

The award was open to any research scientist who had made a significant contribution at the intersection of computing and the sciences covering Biological Sciences, Physical Sciences, Mathematics and Engineering. The prize recognized the importance of interdisciplinary research at the interface of science and computing for advancing scientific boundaries, as well as the importance of investing in European scientists to give Europe a competitive science base. The recipient was selected by a Committee comprising members of the Académie des sciences and Fellows of the Royal Society. The prize consisted of a trophy and monetary amount of €250,000, of which €7,500 is prize money and the rest earmarked for further research. 

The first award was made in 2006 and the last in 2009. It has now been replaced by the Royal Society Milner Award.

List of winners

Microsoft Award today
Today, Microsoft is giving awards for top-performing partners in various countries.

See also

 List of computer-related awards
 List of computer science awards

References

External links
 Official website

2006 establishments in France
2006 establishments in the United Kingdom
Awards established in 2006
British science and technology awards
Computer science awards
Computer-related awards
European awards
French Academy of Sciences
French awards
Microsoft
Royal Society
Science and technology awards